Tavárez (or Tabárez —  or ) is a Spanish surname. The Portuguese version of this name is Tavares. Notable people with the surname include:

Tavárez

Christopher Tavarez (born 1992), American actor
Elisa Tavárez (1879–1960), Puerto Rican pianist 
Jesús Tavárez (born 1971), Dominican-American professional baseball player
Julián Tavárez (born 1973), Dominican-American professional baseball player
Manuel Gregorio Tavárez (1843–1883), Puerto Rican composer
Rosa Tavarez (born 1939), Dominican painter 
Rosanna Tavarez (born 1977), Dominican-American entertainment reporter
Shannon Tavarez (1999–2010), American child actress and singer
Suzy Tavarez (born 1975), American radio personality tavarez josiah wilson born 1998

Tabárez
Óscar Tabárez (born 1947), Uruguayan football manager

Spanish-language surnames